Peter Munch may refer to:

 Peter Andreas Munch (1810–1863), Norwegian historian
 Peter Rochegune Munch (1870–1948), Danish historian and politician
 Peter A. Munch (1908–1984), Norwegian-American sociologist, educator and author